Randers Municipality is a municipality (Danish, kommune) in Region Midtjylland on the Jutland peninsula in central Denmark. January 2022). Its mayor, since 1 January 2018 is Torben Hansen, a member of the Social Democrats. The main town and the site of its municipal council is the city of Randers.

The municipality is part of Business Region Aarhus and of the East Jutland metropolitan area, which had a total population of 1.378 million in 2016.

Overview
The Guden River (Gudenå), Denmark's longest river, runs from Randers Fjord in Nørhald municipality to the east, through the city of Randers, and splits in two ca. 5 kilometers west of the central city.  The northern tributary is called Nørreå ("Northern River"), and it continues westward, defining part of the boundary between Århus and Viborg Counties, and terminates at Vedsø ("Lake Ved") near the town of Rindsholm in Viborg municipality.  The 160 kilometer long Guden River continues to Tinnet Krat in Vejle County.

The city's nearly 3 kilometer long Guden River Park (Gudenåparken) stretches along the river's banks in the center of the town.

History
On 1 January 2007, Randers municipality was, as the result of Kommunalreformen ("The Municipal Reform" of 2007), merged with existing Nørhald, Purhus, and a portion of each of the following municipalities— Langå, Sønderhald, and Mariager— to form an enlarged Randers municipality.

Subdivisions
The municipality is composed by the city of Randers and 31 villages:

Politics

Municipal council
Randers' municipal council consists of 31 members, elected every four years.

Below are the municipal councils elected since the Municipal Reform of 2007.

Notable residents 

 Stygge Krumpen (ca.1485 in Skjøtterup – 1551) a Danish clergyman, secretary of king Christian II of Denmark and the last catholic bishop of the Diocese of Børglum from 1533 to 1536
 Pauline Worm (1825 in Hyllested – 1883) a Danish writer, poet, schoolteacher and feminist
 Christopher Peter Jürgensen (1838 in Gesing – 1911) a Danish precision mechanic and instrument maker
 Niels Lergaard (1893 in Vorup - 1982) a painter, member of the Bornholm school of painters
 Sven Dalsgaard (1914 in Vorup – 1999) a Danish painter, sculptor and writer

Sport 
 Lars Elstrup (born 1963 in Råby) a Danish former professional footballer, with 340 club caps and 34 for Denmark
 Erik Bo Andersen (born 1970 in Dronningborg) a Danish former professional footballer with 200 club caps and 6 for Denmark
 Michael Gravgaard (born 1978 in Spentrup) a Danish former footballer with 317 club caps and 18 for Denmark
 Simone Böhme (born 1991 in Spentrup) a Danish female handballer

Sources
 Municipal statistics: NetBorger Kommunefakta, delivered from KMD aka Kommunedata (Municipal Data)
 Municipal mergers and neighbors: Eniro new municipalities map
 Searchable/printable municipal maps: Krak mapsearch (outline visible but doesn't print out!)

References

External links

 Municipality's official website
 Randers tourism bureau
¨

 
Municipalities of the Central Denmark Region
Municipalities of Denmark
Populated places established in 2007